Sileby railway station is a railway station serving the village of Sileby in Leicestershire, England.

History
The original station was built in 1840 for the Midland Counties Railway, which in 1844 joined the North Midland Railway and the Birmingham and Derby Junction Railway to form the Midland Railway.

The line cut the village in two connecting the halves with a substantial stone bridge.

There were complaints from local residents about the facilities provided at the station. In 1897 the parish council were petitioning the company for improvements, but the Midland Railway company were resistant. By 1910 the council raised a petition to the company to resolve 5 issues
The dangerous level crossing, stating the several accidents had been narrowly avoided.
The need of better accommodation for vehicular traffic. The number of vehicles using the station had increased and blocking of the road, especially by milk carts, was a danger as well as an inconvenience
The want of a comfortable waiting room on the up platform. There was only an open shelter with no provision for a fire in cold weather.
The lowness of the platforms, which were thought to be the cause of a passenger suffering a fractured ankle when alighting from a train.
The need for an entrance from Brook Street.
This time the council were more successful as early in 1912 they received a letter from the Railway Company confirming the improvements which would be made.
Access from King Street to the up-platform without passengers having to cross the running lines.
Improved vehicular access to the station
The additional waiting room 
Raising and lengthening the platforms
Footpath access from Brook Street.

The platform structures were of timber and very little remains after closure in 1968 apart from the station house.

It reopened on 27 May 1994 as part of phase one of the Ivanhoe Line.

Station masters

William F. Jacques until 1861
Benjamin Preston 1861 - 1874
W. Mee 1874 - 1876
Eli Crofts 1876 - 1888
William J. Martin 1888 - 1892
Walter George Fudge 1892 - 1898 (formerly station master at Wixford, afterwards station master at Wigston Magna)
Henry Dring 1898 - 1907
Thomas William Bloore 1907 - 1915
Edward Arnold ca. 1920 (afterwards station master at Whittington Moor)
Arthur Fourt 1922 - ???? (formerly station master at Borrowash)
J.W. Flint 1937 - ????

Facilities
The station is unstaffed and facilities are limited although there is a self-service ticket machine for ticket purchases and shelters on both platforms.

Step-free access is not available to either of the platforms at the station.

Services
All services at Sileby are operated by East Midlands Railway using Class 156, 158 and 170 DMUs.

The typical off-peak service in trains per hour is:
 1 tph to 
 1 tph to  via  of which 1 tp2h continues to 

Fast trains on the Midland Main Line pass by the station but do not stop.

The station is closed on Sundays.

References

External links

Railway stations in Leicestershire
DfT Category F2 stations
Former Midland Railway stations
Railway stations in Great Britain opened in 1840
Railway stations in Great Britain closed in 1968
Railway stations in Great Britain opened in 1994
Railway stations served by East Midlands Railway
Beeching closures in England
Reopened railway stations in Great Britain